Mike Goodes (born December 3, 1956) is an American professional golfer.

Goodes was born in Reidsville, North Carolina. He won several amateur tournaments in the Carolinas, and attended the University of North Carolina, but did not play on the golf team.

Goodes turned professional in 2007 and started playing on the Champions Tour via open qualifying. He finished 5th at the 2007 Champions Tour Q-school which allowed him to open qualify for tour events again in 2008. He finished 29th on the money list in 2008, earning his tour card for 2009. He won his first event of 2009, the Allianz Championship.

Amateur wins
1989 North Carolina Amateur
1998 Carolinas Mid-Amateur
2004 Carolinas Mid-Amateur
2006 North Carolina Amateur, North Carolina Mid-Amateur, Carolinas Mid-Amateur

Professional wins (2)

Champions Tour wins (1)

Champions Tour playoff record (0–1)

Other senior wins (1)
2007 Tarheel Classic (Sunbelt Senior Tour)

External links

American male golfers
PGA Tour Champions golfers
Golfers from North Carolina
University of North Carolina at Chapel Hill alumni
People from Reidsville, North Carolina
People from Browns Summit, North Carolina
1956 births
Living people